In geometry, Steffen's polyhedron is a flexible polyhedron discovered (in 1978) by and named after . It is based on the Bricard octahedron, but unlike the Bricard octahedron its surface does not cross itself. With nine vertices, 21 edges, and 14 triangular faces, it is the simplest possible non-crossing flexible polyhedron. Its faces can be decomposed into three subsets: two six-triangle-patches from a Bricard octahedron, and two more triangles (the central two triangles of the net shown in the illustration) that link these patches together.  

It obeys the strong bellows conjecture, meaning that (like the Bricard octahedron on which it is based) its Dehn invariant stays constant as it flexes.

References

External links
Steffen's Polyhedron, Greg Egan

Nonconvex polyhedra
Mathematics of rigidity